Gekko palmatus, also known as the palm gecko or the palmated gecko, is a species of gecko. It is endemic to Vietnam.

References

Gekko
Reptiles of Vietnam
Endemic fauna of Vietnam
Reptiles described in 1907
Taxa named by George Albert Boulenger